James Henry Flatley III (born January 9, 1934 in San Diego), is a retired rear admiral in the United States Navy. A naval aviator, fighter pilot, and test pilot, he is the son of Vice Admiral James H. Flatley.

Education
Flatley is a 1956 graduate of the United States Naval Academy. He later received an MBA from Auburn University.

Career

While a lieutenant at the Naval Air Test Center at NAS Patuxent River, Maryland, Flatley and his fellow crew members, LCDR Walter W. "Smokey" Stovall and Aviation Machinist's Mate (Jet). V 1st Class Ed Brennan, made history when they completed 21 full-stop landings and takeoffs in a Lockheed C-130 Hercules aboard the aircraft carrier ; it was the largest plane, with the heaviest load, ever to successfully land on a carrier. Flatley later commanded the aircraft carrier . He retired in 1987.

Awards he received during his career include the Silver Star, the Distinguished Flying Cross and the Air Medal. He has also been inducted into the U.S. Naval Aviation Carrier Hall of Fame and the South Carolina Aviation Hall of Fame.

Recent times
In a June 2017 tribute article, Flatley discussed his history in the field of aviation and reflected on his and the Flatley family's legacy, estimating that the "extended Flatley family has accumulated more than 6,100 incident/accident-free arrested carrier landings."

Personal life
Rear Admiral Flatley is married to Nancy Monica Christie of Norfolk,  Virginia. They have six children. Their two oldest sons, James H. Flatley IV and Joseph F. Flatley are Navy fighter pilots and their youngest daughter Kara is a lieutenant in the Supply  Corps and is married to Richard  Brophy, a Navy fighter pilot. Her sister, Mary, is married to Rex  Kiteley, a  Navy flight surgeon. RADM Flatley's father was James H. Flatley, the  first air group commander and World  War II fighter ace and the Pacific theater namesake for carrier aviations Safety Award – The Flatley Award.

References

1934 births
Living people
United States Naval Academy alumni
United States Naval Aviators
Recipients of the Air Medal
Recipients of the Distinguished Flying Cross (United States)
Auburn University alumni
Recipients of the Silver Star
United States Navy rear admirals (upper half)